Mukeiras  is an airport serving the town of Mukayras in Yemen.

See also
Transport in Yemen

References

External links
  Great Circle Mapper - Mukeiras
 SkyVector - Mukeiras

Airports in Yemen